Brzozowski (feminine: Brzozowska; plural: Brzozowscy) is a Polish toponymic surname derived from the place name Brzozów, which is itself derived from 'brzoza' ("birch").

In the Russian Empire, the surname was written in Russian variously as Бжозовский, Бржозовский, Бжезовский, Бржезовский, and may accordingly be transliterated as Bzhozovsky, Brzhozovsky, Bzhezovsky, Brzhezovsky. Occasionally it was even translated as Berezovski.

People with the surname include:

 Artur Brzozowski (born 1985), Polish athlete
 Dariusz Brzozowski (born 1980), Polish drummer
 Dorota Brzozowska (born 1964), Polish swimmer
 Edward Brzozowski (1920–1983), Polish football player and manager
 Janusz Brzozowski (disambiguation), multiple people
 Julia Niewiarowska-Brzozowska (1827–1891), Polish composer
 Krystian Brzozowski (born 1982), Polish wrestler
 Krzysztof Brzozowski (born 1993), Polish athlete
 Rafał Brzozowski, Polish singer and TV presenter
 Stanisław Brzozowski (disambiguation), multiple people
 Tadeusz Brzozowski (1749–1820), Polish Jesuit

See also
 
 
 Brzozów County, a territory in south-eastern Poland
 Brzozowski derivative

References

Polish-language surnames